My Super Psycho Sweet 16 is an American slasher film franchise that comprises three films, and was produced by MTV. Each film follows Skye Rotter, a teenaged outcast, and her friends who are stalked and murdered by a psychopath during a sweet sixteen birthday party.

Background
Director Jacob Gentry worked on the film with his long-time friend Alex Motlagh. Gentry was not a fan of reality shows, figuring they are "the lowest form of entertainment you have". But once he started watching the series My Super Sweet 16 that the producers were trying to base the first film on, he had a realization that it's the perfect scenario for a horror film. Gentry went on to say he's aware that the film "is clearly in the "slasher genre" where there are rules viewers expect will be followed. It's like playing the blues, you want to give it your spin but you don't want to interrupt the formula too much. You still have to play the blues. In this case, we don't want to reinvent the wheel".

Films

My Super Psycho Sweet 16 (2009)

Madison Penrose, spoiled throughout her life, convinces her rich parents to re-open a nearby rollerdome for her Sweet 16 birthday party. The rollerdome once closed because a series of brutal murders took place at the locale, and, of course, the killer returns to wreak havoc during her party.

Birthday Theme: Madison Penrose (Julianna Guill).

My Super Psycho Sweet 16: Part 2 (2010)

Skye Rotter is on the run, having fled the Roller Dome massacre from the end of the first movie. With nowhere left to turn, Skye heads to the quiet town of Mill Basin and the mother who abandoned her years ago. There, she meets her younger half-sister Alex and Alex's manipulative best friend Zoe. Skye hopes she's finally found safety in her new family, but she's about to learn she can't outrun her past. While her friends Brigg and Derek desperately try to locate her, the same psycho from the first film comes to town with one bloody mission: to turn Skye's upcoming birthday into a Sweet 16 she'll never forget, turning a weekend rager into the savage setting.

Birthday Theme: Skye Rotter (Lauren McKnight).

My Super Psycho Sweet 16: Part 3 (2012)

Having endured the torment of high school and survived the bloodbath at the Rollerdome, Skye Rotter is ready to break free of "Psycho Skye" and head to college for a new life. But before Skye can truly escape her dark past, there's still one last party she has to attend - her estranged sister Alex is having her Sweet 16, and someone has made certain the Lord of the Rink's bloody legacy lives on. One way or another, the party will end here.    
       
Birthday Theme: Alex Bell (Kirsten Prout).

Cast
A  indicates the actor portrayed the role of a younger version of the character.
A dark gray cell indicates the character was not in the film.

Crew

See also
 My Super Sweet 16

References

External links
 
 
 

My Super Psycho Sweet 16
American teen horror films
Horror film series
Film series introduced in 2009
Television film series
Horror film franchises
Trilogies